Belgium–China relations began in the early 1970s about 20 years after mainland China came under communist rule. China has an embassy in Brussels whilst Belgium has an embassy in Beijing and consulates in Guangzhou, Hong Kong and Shanghai.

History 
Diplomatic relations between the People's Republic of China and the Belgium were established on 25 October 1971. The diplomatic relationship began to improve and grow during the 1980s with visits from high-ranking governments from both sides such as Zhu Rongji in April 1991 and Vice-premier Qian Qichen in March 1992. From the Belgium side, Crown Prince Albert  has visited China in May 1993 and the king of Belgium, Crown Prince Philippe visited in November 1996 and May 2000. The former prime ministers Jean-Luc Dehaene visited China in November 1998 and Prime Minister Guy Verhofstadt visited in March 2002.

China's Vice President Xi Jinping has been to Belgium in October 2009 to enhance bilateral cooperation in terms of trade, human and cultural exchanges.

The bilateral relationship has increased with economic trade between the two countries. Belgium has a pavilion in the Shanghai Expo 2010.

In July 2019, the UN ambassadors from 22 nations, including Belgium, signed a joint letter to the UNHRC condemning China's mistreatment of the Uyghurs as well as its mistreatment of other minority groups, urging the Chinese government to close the Xinjiang re-education camps.

In 2019 as punishment for visiting Taiwan President of the Senate Jacques Brotchi received a lifetime ban from entering China.

In June 2020, Belgium openly opposed the Hong Kong national security law

Trade
The trade between the two countries in 2013 came to a value of EUR20.2 billion. China is Belgium's sixth biggest trading partner which makes up 4.1% of Belgium's trade. The trade between the two countries in 2008 exceeded 20 billion and growing on average 20% every year.

Chinese people in Belgium
Qian Xiuling (1912–2008), or Siou-Ling Tsien de Perlinghi, was an immigrant to Belgium from the Republic of China who helped to save nearly 100 Belgian people from execution by the Nazis during World War II. She won a medal in Belgium and had a street named after her.

See also
 Foreign relations of Belgium 
 Foreign relations of China 
 China–EU relations

References

External links 
Embassy of Belgium in China
Embassy of China in Belgium
 

 
Bilateral relations of China
China